Pınarönü can refer to:

 Pınarönü, Beyağaç
 Pınarönü, Devrek
 Pınarönü, Erzincan